Fraxinus bungeana is a species of flowering plant belonging to the family Oleaceae.

It is native to China.

References

bungeana